Black River-Hardwicke is a Local Service District in Northumberland County, New Brunswick.  This may also refer to Black River Bridge, Black River or Hardwick.

History

Notable people

See also
List of local service districts in New Brunswick

References

Communities in Northumberland County, New Brunswick
Designated places in New Brunswick
Local service districts of Northumberland County, New Brunswick